is a former Japanese football player. His elder brother Takahiro is a former Japanese baseball player.

Playing career
Yamazaki was born in Shizuoka Prefecture on July 25, 1978. After graduating from Shizuoka Gakuen High School, he joined Japan Football League club Montedio Yamagata in 1997. However he could hardly play in the match until 1998. In 1999, he moved to newly was promoted to J2 League club, Oita Trinita. He played many matches as center back from 1999. In 2002, although he could not play many matches, the club won the champions and was promoted to J1 League. He also became a regular player as right side back again in 2003. However his opportunity to play decreased in 2004. In 2005, he moved to Cerezo Osaka. He played many matches as center back until 2005. However the club was relegated to J2 from 2007 and he could not play at all in the match in 2007. In 2008, he returned to Oita Trinita. He retired end of 2008 season.

Club statistics

References

External links

1978 births
Living people
Association football people from Shizuoka Prefecture
Japanese footballers
J1 League players
J2 League players
Japan Football League (1992–1998) players
Montedio Yamagata players
Oita Trinita players
Cerezo Osaka players
Association football defenders